Choti Zareen (Urdu: چوٹی زیریں) is a town and union council of Dera Ghazi Khan District, Tehsil Kot Chutta in the Punjab province of Pakistan.

It is 30 km to the southwest of Dera Ghazi Khan and 26 km to the east of Sulaiman Range.

M irfan 

A kind hearted person

References

Populated places in Dera Ghazi Khan District
Union councils of Dera Ghazi Khan District
Cities and towns in Punjab, Pakistan